Michael Zachary Petri (born August 16, 1984) is a former American rugby union player who played for Rugby United New York (RUNY) of Major League Rugby (MLR). His position was scrum-half. He is known as "Peaches" by his teammates. He currently is the head coach for RUNY's academy development program.

Petri has previously played for the Newport Gwent Dragons, Sale Sharks, and Barbarians FC (2009).

Early life and education
Petri began playing rugby as a freshman at Xavier High School in New York City. Petri's father, also Mike, played rugby as a youth at St. Francis Prep and encouraged his participation in the sport.

He then attended Penn State University where he was a four-time College All American.  He graduated with a degree in Life Sciences and a minor in Business.  He was on the Deans List, the Alpha Epsilon Delta National Pre-Health Honors Society, and the Phi Eta Sigma National Honors Society.

Rugby career
Petri captained the USA U19 and College All-American sides and won the 2006 Doug Edwards Award, which is awarded to the most outstanding collegiate rugby player.

Petri earned 57 test caps for the United States national rugby union team representing the United States at the 2007 Rugby World Cup in France, the 2011 Rugby World Cup in New Zealand, and the 2015 Rugby World Cup in England.  He served as captain of NYAC and led them to national championship titles in 2008, 2010, 2012, and 2015. He also won a national championship title with Belmont Shore RFC in 2007 while living in Long Beach, CA. Petri signed to play with Rugby United New York in October 2018 and served as their captain for the 2019 MLR season.

Coaching career
Petri was named head coach of New York Athletic Club Rugby for the 2019 Elite Cup season.

In 2021, Petri stepped away from the playing field to become a full-time head coach for Rugby United New York's creation of an Academy program to identify and develop local collegiate and talent for the club.

Personal life
Outside of rugby, Petri worked at his family’s plumbing business and in construction.  He also worked with a UBS wealth management team. He became more involved in portfolio analysis and trading but quit the job to pursue rugby full-time.

Petri is an accomplished author, writing the children's alphabet book R is for Rugby, which was published in June 2015.

Honors

Team
Rugby Super League (4): 2007, 2008, 2010, 2012
Division 1 Club Rugby Championship (1): 2015

Individual
Collegiate All-American (4): 2003, 2004, 2005, 2006
Collegiate All-Star Tournament MVP (1): 2006
Doug Edwards Award (1): 2006
NYAC Male Athlete of the Year (1): 2011
Rugby Super League Finals MVP (1) 2010
Division 1 Club Rugby Championship Finals MVP (1): 2015

External links
 Mike Petri Video Feature by AIG
 USA Player Profile
 ESPN Player Profile

References

 BroBible.com Feature
 Wall Street Journal Feature (2010)
 Wall Street Journal Feature (2015)
 NY Daily News Feature (2015)

1984 births
Living people
Rugby union scrum-halves
American rugby union players
United States international rugby union players
Rugby New York players
Pennsylvania State University alumni
Xavier High School (New York City) alumni
Sportspeople from Brooklyn